Pyatiletka is a rural locality (a selo) and the administrative centre of Nadezhdinsky Selsoviet, Iglinsky District, Bashkortostan, Russia. The population was 238 as of 2010.

Geography 
It is located 45 km from Iglino.

References 

Rural localities in Iglinsky District